Rochester is a small village and civil parish in north Northumberland, England. The village is the site of the Roman fort of Bremenium, built there to protect the important Roman road of Dere Street, which passes through the village.

The civil parish extends north west of the village to the Scottish border. It includes the settlements of Byrness, Horsley, Ramshope and Cottonshopeburnfoot, and the now closed Redesdale Camp, an army base in the Otterburn Training Area. In the 2001 census (when Redesdale Camp was open) the parish had a population of 358, reducing to 344 at the 2011 Census.

Climate
Rochester has an oceanic climate (Köppen: Cfb).

Governance 
Rochester is in the parliamentary constituency of Hexham. Rochester was formerly a township in Elsdon parish, in 1866 Rochester became a civil parish in its own right, on 25 March 1886 Rochester was merged with Ramshope to form Rochester Ward, on 1 April 1958 Rochester Ward was merged with Troughend to form "Rochester".

References

 J. Collingwood Bruce, Roman Wall (1863), Harold Hill & Son, 
 Frank Graham, The Roman Wall, Comprehensive History and Guide (1979), Frank Graham,

External links
 

 
Villages in Northumberland
Civil parishes in Northumberland